Golam Rabbani Helal was a Bangladesh national footballer and organizer.

Career 
From 1979 to 1985, Helal played for the Bangladesh national football team. He also played for Abahani from 1975 to 1988. He briefly played for the Bangladesh Jute Mills Corporation football team, Team BJMC.  After retiring from playing he became a director of Abahani. In April 2008, his candidacy for the Bangladesh Football Federation was challenged in court by Shamsul Haque Chowdhury. The court dismissed the charges and cleared the way for him to contest the election. On 10 July 2008, he was made a member of Dhaka Metropolis League Committee. From 2008 to 2012, he was an executive member of Bangladesh Football Federation. On 11 December 2011, he resigned from the National Team Management Committee of the Bangladesh Football Federation after describing them as inefficient and ineffective.

Helal was to contest the Bangladesh Football Federation for the post of President in 2012. He withdrew his candidacy and threw his support behind the incumbent, Kazi Salahuddin.

Helal was arrested in 1982 after getting into a brawl with players of Mohammedan Sporting Club, arch rivals of Abahani, during a match. The rivalry between Abahani and Mohammedan Sporting Club is called the Dhaka Derby. Ashraf Uddin Ahmed Chunnu, Kazi Anwar, and Kazi Salahuddin were also arrested along with Helal.

Death 
Helal died on 30 May 2020 at Square Hospital, Dhaka, Bangladesh. He was being treated for brain haemorrhage. He was buried in Azimpur Graveyard.

References 

2020 deaths
Bangladeshi footballers
Bangladesh international footballers
Bangladeshi football managers
Association footballers not categorized by position
Abahani Limited (Dhaka) players